Čović is a surname that may refer to:

 Adrian Covic (born 1967), Romanian nephrologist
 Ante Čović (born 1975), Croatian Australian soccer player
 Ante Čović (Croatian footballer) (born 1975), Croatian soccer player
 Dragan Čović (born 1956), Croat politician
 Mehmedalija Čović (born 1986), Bosnian football player
 Nebojša Čović (born 1958), Serbian politician
 Žana Čović (born 1989), Croatian handball player.

See also
 COVIC, the abbreviation for the Colonial Office Visual Instruction Committee 

Surnames